The British Army Germany rugby union team is the rugby union team of the British Army in Germany. It is part of the Army Rugby Union.

The team regularly plays games against emerging nations like Belgium, Denmark, Netherlands, Germany and Luxembourg.

The British Forces Germany also have a very successful representative sevens squad.

History
No records exist of rugby matches played by the British occupation forces in Germany after the First World War, despite a ten-year presence of the British Army of the Rhine until 1929.

After the Second World War, a representative side was formed, whose fixtures have helped an interest in the playing of rugby in those countries.

2009-10 fixtures
The fixtures and results of the team for 2009-10:

 The game against Germany had to be postponed twice because of bad weather and was eventually cancelled.

References

External links
 British Army (Germany) Rugby Army Rugby Union website
 British Forces Germany website

British forces in Germany
British rugby union clubs
German rugby union clubs
Rugby union in the British Army
Military sports teams